The Raid 2, also known as The Raid: Retaliation, is a 2014 Indonesian action thriller film written, directed and edited by the Welsh filmmaker Gareth Evans. It is the sequel to the 2011 film The Raid and stars Iko Uwais, Arifin Putra, Oka Antara, Tio Pakusadewo, Alex Abbad, Julie Estelle, Ryuhei Matsuda, Kenichi Endō, and Kazuki Kitamura. The film was released in the United States and Canada by Sony Pictures Classics on 28 March 2014. Like its predecessor, it received generally positive reviews from critics.

In the story, special forces officer Rama is sent undercover to expose the corrupt police officials colluding with the crime families of Jakarta's criminal underworld. Like Evans' previous films Merantau and The Raid, the fight scenes showcase the Indonesian fighting style of pencak silat.

Plot

Immediately after helping his brother, Rama, take down his boss in the previous film, Jakarta gang boss Andi is captured and executed by another criminal, Bejo. Meanwhile, Rama brings his injured squadmate Bowo and corrupt superior Lt. Wahyu to meet Lt. Bunawar, head of an internal investigation unit. Bunawar send Bowo away to be treated and has Wahyu killed under the pretense of keeping Rama safe from other crooked cops and asks Rama to help him expose police chief Reza's crooked dealings with the Bangun and Goto crime syndicates. Rama initially refuses, but agrees after learning of Andi's death.

Bunawar tasks Rama to infiltrate Bangun's organization undercover. He suggests Rama to gain the trust of Bangun's son Uco, who is currently in prison. Using the pseudonym Yuda, Rama deliberately lets himself get arrested and put in the same prison as Uco. In prison, Rama successfully gains Uco's trust by saving his life during a violent riot intended to cover up an assassination. Two years later, Rama is released from prison and Uco picks him up to meet Bangun, who hires Rama out of gratitude. After doing some work for Bangun, Uco meets up with Rama, telling him that he is frustrated with his limited role in his father's organization and thinks that he deserves to be involved in Bangun's bigger operations. Rama uses the opportunity to secretly plant a bug in Uco's wallet.

Uco meets Bejo, who shares rumors of a plot to turn Reza and others against his father. Bejo allows Uco to kill the gang members responsible for the prison riot, and they hatch a plot to start a gang war between Bangun and Goto so Uco can prove his worth to his father and Bejo can take Goto's territory. Uco then sets Prakoso, Bangun's most loyal hitman, up to be killed by the Assassin, Bejo's top enforcer. Uco tries to convince Bangun that Prakoso's death is caused by Goto's men, but Bangun refuses to retaliate. Frustrated, Uco tells Bejo to have his 2 hitmen, siblings Hammer Girl and Baseball Bat Man, kill several of Goto's men. When Bangun and Goto meet to discuss the situation, Uco lashes out in anger, embarrassing Bangun into conceding territory. Bangun angrily beats Uco when they return to his office, berating him for meaninglessly disrupt the peace between the two organizations. Meanwhile, Rama is suddenly attacked by Reza's corrupt cops, but managed to defeat them. While recovering after the attack, Rama is urgently called to Bangun's office by Bangun's advisor Eka.

While Rama makes his way to Bangun's office, Bejo arrives with the Assassin and a mob of henchmen. Uco finally reveals his betrayal by killing his father and wounds Eka. Before Bejo can finish Eka off, Rama arrives and gives Eka the chance to escape, but is subdued by the Assassin and driven away to be executed. Eka rescues Rama in a violent car chase, but is critically injured in the process. Before Rama leave, Eka reveals to Rama that he knows Rama is working undercover and that he is also an undercover officer. Meanwhile, Goto's henchman Ryuichi informs Goto of Uco's betrayal and that Reza is meeting Bejo and Uco. Lt. Bunawar informs Rama that the gang war has escalated after the police commissioner has been killed. He also informs Rama of the meeting between Reza, Bejo, and Uco.

Still shaken after killing his father, Uco discovers Rama's bug in his wallet. He notices Bejo has the same tattoo as the gang member who tried to kill him during the riot. Uco finally realizes that he has been used only as a pawn by Bejo. Meanwhile, Rama attacks Bejo's restaurant warehouse and makes his way up, taking down Bejo's henchmen including Hammer Girl and Baseball Bat Man. Rama also managed to defeat the Assassin after an intense, brutal, and bloody battle. 

Rama finally makes his way to Bejo and disrupts the meeting. Bejo attempts to shoot Rama but Uco managed to shoot and kill Reza and Bejo first. Before Uco can kill Rama as well, Rama throws the Assassin's karambit at him and stabs him to death. Weakened and exhausted after the fight, Rama limps away from the premises and encounters Goto's men led by Goto's son Keichi who were sent to attack the meeting. While Lt. Bunawar drives to the site, Keichi smirks as he silently offers a deal to Rama, who responds with "No... Enough."

Cast

 Iko Uwais as Rama/Yuda, one of the three surviving police officers of the first film's eponymous raid, and a special forces member turned undercover agent. His alias "Yuda" is a reference to Uwais' character in his debut film Merantau.
 Arifin Putra as Uco, a vicious, petulant mobster who is the son and heir to Bangun.
 Oka Antara as Eka, Bangun's consigliere who holds a secret of his own.
 Tio Pakusadewo as Bangun, a notorious kingpin who is one of the two mob bosses in control of Jakarta's underworld.
 Alex Abbad as Bejo, a self-made Jakarta crime boss who considers himself very ambitious.
 Julie Estelle as Alicia/"Hammer Girl", a merciless assassin who uses claw hammers as her signature weapon. She is deaf, and later revealed to be missing an eye, the reason she wears sunglasses at all times. 
 Kenichi Endō as Hideaki Goto (Nihongo: 後藤英明, Gotō Hideaki), founder and head (oyabun/kumicho) of the Goto family, a powerful Yakuza family from Japan and one of the two mob bosses in control of Jakarta's underworld.
 Ryuhei Matsuda as Keiichi Goto (Nihongo: 後藤圭一, Gotō Keiichi), Goto's son and heir.
 Kazuki Kitamura as Ryuichi (Nihongo: 龍一, Ryūichi), Goto's lieutenant and interpreter.
 Yayan Ruhian as Prakoso, Bangun's most loyal and dedicated hitman.
  as "The Assassin", Bejo's top enforcer who uses the karambit as his signature weapon.
  as "Baseball Bat Man", Alicia's brother and one of Bejo's top three hitmen.
  as Bunawar, the head of the internal investigation unit who recruits Rama to bring down the police–mob collusion.
 Roy Marten as Reza, a corrupt high-ranking police official affiliated with the Gotos but whom Bejo wants to buy out in his plans for expansion.
  as Topan, operator of an illegal "porn den" in Bangun's territory, who receives a visit when word gets out he's expanded into the drug business.
 Zack Lee as Benny, an associate of Uco in prison who betrays his trust.
 Donny Alamsyah as Andi, Rama's gangster brother who is executed by Bejo.
  as Bowo, Rama's colleague and one of three surviving officers of the first film's eponymous raid.
 Alain O. as Wahyu, the corrupt lieutenant and one of three surviving officers of the first film's eponymous raid. 
  as Dwi, Prakoso's estranged wife.

Other cast members include Henky Solaiman and Fikha Effendi, who reprise their roles as Rama's father and wife, Isa, respectively. Deddy Sutomo and Pong Hardjatmo make cameos as the mediator and police commissioner, respectively.

Production

Development
Writer-director Gareth Evans decided to make the sequel after The Raid hit at the box office. He saw it as an opportunity to receive funding for a script he wrote in 2009, Berandal, which he had trouble funding for two years. Berandal was originally conceived as a standalone action drama film which incorporates bigger action scenes and according to Evans tells the story of "a young guy who goes into prison, befriends the son of a mob boss, comes out, joins him as an enforcer and then has to survive a gang war". After The Raid, Evans began significantly rewriting the Berandal script to connect its storyline with that of the first film; the process included tweaking the protagonist's character motivation and adding a police procedural subplot.

Casting and filming
Julie Estelle was cast as "Hammer Girl" in December 2012; Evans also tweeted that internationally renowned silat practitioner Cecep Arif Rahman was also given a major part in the film. Marsha Timothy, Mathias Muchus, Tio Pakusadewo, and Alex Abbad, who worked with Evans in Merantau, were also cast in the film. Japanese actors Matsuda Ryuhei (known for his roles in Taboo and Nana), Kenichi Endō (known for his roles included Crows Zero, Crows Zero 2 and 
Dead or Alive 2: Birds) and Kitamura Kazuki, known for his roles in Young Thugs: Innocent Blood, Dead or Alive and Ley Lines, but also known for being the only one of the three Japanese actors appeared in Indonesian films, following his appearance in the 2014 film  Killers.

Evans also revealed on Twitter that Yayan Ruhian, who played Mad Dog in The Raid, will return for the sequel as a new character called Prakoso, the machete-wielding chief assassin of Bangun. He claimed that he would not do a martial arts film without Ruhian being involved. Ruhian, who is a choreographer of the film, also trained Estelle in pencak silat.

In January 2013, PT Merantau Films and XYZ Films announced the start of production. The filming process took about seven months and ended in July 2013.

The film's lead cinematographer Matt Flannery tweeted that at least three RED cameras were used in a test shoot of a chase scene. Gareth Evans mentioned that they were using RED Scarlet for 95% of the shoot, Epic for slow mo, and Go Pro 3 for quick cuts during the car chase.

Marketing
A teaser trailer was released at Twitch Film on 6 November 2013. The Hollywood Reporter stated that the trailer "unleashes more action than most Hollywood blockbusters." A longer Indonesian trailer was released on 31 December 2013. The American trailer was released on 21 January 2014. On 26 March 2014, a deleted scene (given the title "Gang War") was released to promote the film.

International release
The film was marketed internationally through Celluloid Nightmares, a partnership between US-based XYZ Films and France's Celluloid Dreams.

Sony Pictures Worldwide Acquisitions acquired the film's distribution rights for the United States, Latin America and Spain; and Kadokawa Pictures for Japan. Distribution rights to other countries were sold to eOne Entertainment for Canada and the United Kingdom; Koch Media for Germany, Switzerland and Austria; Calinos Films for Turkey; HGC for China; and Madman Entertainment for Australia.

Release

The film had its world premiere at the 2014 Sundance Film Festival on 21 January 2014. It also screened at South by Southwest on 10 March 2014 and ARTE Indonesia Arts Festival on 14 March 2014. Following a wide release on 11 April 2014, due to low returns the majority of theaters closed the film one week later. This was similar to what occurred during the theatrical run of the first film.

Censorship
The Raid 2 was banned in neighboring Malaysia. The film was scheduled to hit Malaysian screens on 28 March, but had not been shown anywhere in the country due to its excessive violence. Indonesian politician, and former Army Chief of Staff, Pramono Edhie Wibowo criticized the decision and demanded an explanation. He further asked the Indonesian Ministry of Foreign Affairs to "actively perform its mediation function with the Malaysian government."

The US release was given an R rating by the MPAA for "strong bloody violence throughout, sexuality and language", cutting a few frames of graphic violence. Director Evans stated the cuts are very minimal and similar to his original cut. The film received an R-15 rating in Japan with 4 minutes cut, and an R-18 uncut version which was screened in the Tokyo metropolitan area.

Reception

Box office
In Indonesia, the film sold 1,434,272 tickets at the box office in 2014.

Overseas, the film grossed $2,627,209 in the United States and Canada. In Japan, it grossed  at the box office. In other overseas territories outside Indonesia, the film grossed $3,939,707, for an overseas total of  outside of Indonesia.

Home media 
In the United States, the film grossed  from physical DVD and Blu-ray sales, . In the United Kingdom, The Raid 2 was 2015's best-selling foreign-language film on home video.

Critical response
, the film has an approval rating of 82% on review aggregation website Rotten Tomatoes, based on 175 reviews, with an average rating of 7.50/10. The site's consensus states: "Although its high-energy plot and over-the-top violence may play better with genre aficionados, The Raid 2 definitely delivers more of everything audiences loved about its predecessor." On Metacritic, the film has a weighted average score of 71 out of 100 based on reviews from 34 critics, indicating "generally favorable reviews".

During its world premiere at Sundance, The Raid 2 received an overwhelming reaction. Mark Olsen of the Los Angeles Times reported that "The screening caused an explosion of excitement and enthusiasm for the film on social media."

In a 3-out-of-5 mixed review, Joey Magidson of the website Awards Circuit wrote that he "appreciate(s) the directing skills on display in The Raid 2, but at a certain point, all of the fighting and killing nearly got to be too much for me. I'm recommending the film, but not in the same way as the last one." He added that while it is "creative enough to be worth a recommendation, it lacks the originality of the first flick" and concluded that "The Raid 2 will delight genre fans, but might not impress to[o] many others."

Peter Bradshaw of The Guardian gave the film 4 out of 5 stars and wrote that it "may not have the first Raid's absolute novelty, and the plot is a bit superfluous. But the sheer mayhem-stamina of this followup is really staggering." Henry Barnes of The Guardian gave it 3 out of 5 stars, writing "Out of the tower block and into Jakarta's crime underworld, Gareth Evans's gory sequel is even more violent – you'll thrill despite yourself."

Chris Nashawaty of Entertainment Weekly said, "The Raid 2 will make you feel like Christmas came nine months early. Some action sequels don't know when to say when. But here's one where too much is just the right amount."

Simon Abrams of RogerEbert.com praised the film for its "involving plot"; calling the cast, especially Uwais, "charming" and dialogue "winningly precise" while noting that the sequel is "a great step up after the already-impressive The Raid." Glenn Kenny of RogerEbert.com gave the film 2 out of 4 stars, and wrote "The action stuff in The Raid 2, while likely to alienate the squeamish and summon dark thoughts of cinematic nihilism amongst overthinking highbrows, really IS like nothing else out there."

David Rooney of The Hollywood Reporter gave the film a positive review, remarking, "Evans gives the audience a knowing wink by having Rama endure repeated batterings that would leave mere mortals in traction, not to mention some nasty blade wounds. Yet he keeps coming back, finding the stamina to snap more limbs and crush more skulls. Taking place inside moving vehicles, a subway car, a noodle bar, warehouses, a porn factory, tight corridors and in the most electrifying mano-a-mano clash, a gleaming nightclub kitchen and wine cellar, the fights are dynamite."

Rolling Stone chief critic Peter Travers wrote, "The Raid 2 lets its warriors rip for two and a half thrilling hours. With the precision of dance and the punch of a K.O. champion, Evans keeps the action coming like nobody's business."

Amber Wilkinson of The Daily Telegraph commented, "Hyper-violent it may be but there is beauty in its brutality," and wrote, "To say a martial arts movie brings something fresh in terms of choreography may sound like fighting talk, but Gareth Evans's sequel to his 2011 film is endlessly inventive."

Matt Risley of Total Film gave the film 5 stars and wrote: "Sumptuously shot, perfectly paced and flat-out exhilarating, The Raid 2 cements Evans as the best action director working today and may not be the best action, gangster, or even martial-arts movie ever made. But as a combination of all three, it's unparalleled in recent memory and offers a tantalising glimpse into a post-Bayhem action-movie world. Brutal, beautiful and brilliant" and also wrote, "The sheer imagination on show, both in the cinematography and choreography, guarantees each brawl is instantly iconic. Immaculately edited, each traumatic, tensely tactile fight would blur into chaos if not for Evans's pinpoint pacing something that refreshes all the more in the face of modern blockbusting's tendency to start big and just keep getting bigger, until burnout."

Year-end lists
The film appeared on several critics' year-end lists.
 #2 – Peter Freeman of DCOutlook.com's "Top 10 Movies of 2014"
 #7 – IMDb's "Top 10 Films of 2014"
 #10 – Drew McWeeny of HitFix's "Top 50 Films of 2014"
 #10 – DenOfGeek.com's "Top 10 Films of 2014"
 #14 – Rob Hunter of Film School Rejects' "14 Best Foreign Language Films of 2014"

Accolades
The Raid 2 garnered a number of domestic and international award wins and nominations.

On 19 December 2014, it won the award for Best Foreign Language Film from the Florida Film Critics Circle over Sweden's Force Majeure and Poland's Ida; a first for an Indonesian film. It also received two nominations at the 2014 Phoenix Film Critics Society Awards, for Best Stunts, and Best Foreign Language Film; losing the former to Edge of Tomorrow and the latter to Polish film, Ida. Another nomination came from the 2014 Chicago Film Critics Association Awards on the Best Foreign Language Film category, which it lost to Ruben Östlund's Force Majeure from Sweden. For the 8th Houston Film Critics Society Awards, it also received a nomination in the foreign film category, again losing to Force Majeure.

The film received 10 nominations at the local 2014 Maya Awards, organized by online film community Piala Maya. On 20 December 2014, it won four of its ten nominations: Best Cinematography for Matt Flanery and Dimas Subono, Best Editing for Evans and Andi Novianto, Best Special Effects, and Best Supporting Actor for Arifin Putra. It was also nominated for Best Film, Best Original Score, Most Memorable Featured Appearance for Julie Estelle as 'The Hammer Girl' (all three lost to Cahaya dari Timur); Best Hair & Make-Up and Best Sound Mixing (both lost to Killers), as well as another nomination in the Best Supporting Actor category for Oka Antara (who lost to co-star Arifin Putra).

Cancelled sequel 
On 6 January 2014, media outlets quoted director Gareth Evans stating that The Raid 3 would take place two hours before the end of The Raid 2. On 19 April, during an interview with Metro, director Evans said that he is planning to take a break from martial arts movies for two or three years before filming it. On 21 January 2015, Evans responded on Twitter, "The Raid 3 isn't going to be happening anytime soon. Ideas in my head. Nothing written. No set date. 2018/19 possibly."

In a November 2016 interview with Impact, Evans stated the third film was no longer going forward with the franchise likely having ended, stating, "Moving back to UK felt like a closing chapter on that franchise—we ended the story pretty neatly (I feel) in Part 2. I'm aware there's an interest for it [...] So never say never, but it's unlikely to happen anytime soon."

References

Sources

External links

 
 
 

2014 films
2014 action thriller films
2014 crime action films
2014 crime thriller films
Entertainment One films
Films about corruption
Films about families
Films about the illegal drug trade
Films scored by Joseph Trapanese
Films directed by Gareth Evans
Films set in prison
Gangster films
Indonesian action thriller films
Indonesian martial arts films
Japan in non-Japanese culture
2010s Indonesian-language films
2010s Japanese-language films
2014 martial arts films
Patricide in fiction
Silat films
Maya Award winners
Stage 6 Films films
Films about revenge
Yakuza films
Plaion
Indonesian sequel films
2010s English-language films
2014 multilingual films
Indonesian multilingual films
2010s Japanese films